Deer Creek Township is one of twenty-four townships in Webster County, Iowa, USA.  As of the 2000 census, its population was 437.

Geography
According to the USGS, it contains one cemetery, Trinity Lutheran.

References

External links
 1875 Deer Creek Township land owner map
 1885 Deer Creek Township land owner map
 Deer Creek Township information
 US-Counties.com

Townships in Webster County, Iowa
Townships in Iowa